Lanchyn is an urban-type settlement in Nadvirna Raion in Ivano-Frankivsk Oblast. It hosts the administration of Lanchyn settlement hromada, one of the hromadas of Ukraine.

Location 
Lanchyn is located on the Prut about 42 kilometers south of Ivano-Frankivsk and 16 kilometers southeast of Nadvirna.

History 
Between 1772 and 1918 it was part of Austrian Galicia. After the end of World War I Lanchyn (as Łanczyn) became part of  Nadvirna Powiat in Stanisławów Voivodeship, part of Poland. In 1939 it was annexed by the Soviet Union. In 1940 it became an urban-type settlement.

Lanchyn was occupied by German troops during World War II from 1941 to 1944, part of the District of Galicia. 

Postwar, Lanchyn was briefly the center of the raion.

Notable people 
 Zbigniew Horbowy (1935–2019), Polish glass artist
 Mykhajlo Levitsky (1774–1858), Metropolitan of Lviv

References 

Nadvirna Raion
Populated places on the Prut
Stanisławów Voivodeship
Urban-type settlements in Nadvirna Raion
Shtetls
Holocaust locations in Ukraine